The 2014 Tro-Bro Léon was the 31st edition of the Tro-Bro Léon cycle race and was held on 20 April 2014. The race was won by Adrien Petit.

General classification

References

2014
2014 in road cycling
2014 in French sport